Slugs is a 1982 UK horror novel written by Shaun Hutson. In 1988, it was adapted as an American/Spanish horror film of the same name. In this book, carnivorous slugs go on a rampage.

Synopsis
Slugs in the cellar of an old house feed on scraps of rotten meat someone is unknowingly throwing down to them.

A very drunk Ron Bell stumbles home, passes out in his front room and wakes to find himself being eaten alive by slugs that have come through the floor. The slugs then retreat back down the cellar.

Mike Brady, an almost-40-year-old council health inspector awakes with wife Kim, 35, and discusses that he has to help evict a council tenant Ron Bell that day. Brady accompanies Archie Reece, bailiff, to serve an eviction notice on Ron Bell. They find Bell's mutilated body. The slugs leave Ron Bell's cellar, crawl up into his garden and then down into the sewers towards a new housing estate.

Mary Forbes, housewife, discovers slug larvae in her hanging baskets. Brady, on a routine check of the houses on the new housing estate finds slime trails.

Bert Crossley, a butcher on the new housing estate enjoys a lunch time drink with friends Danny and Tony. On arriving back at his shop afterwards, he discovers the meat he had left in cabinets has vanished, only a few scraps and dark patches of blood remain.

Julie Jenkins, receptionist for the council offices where Brady works, takes a message from pensioner Mrs. Fortune, complaining about her blocked drain and toilet. Brady and effluent operative Don Palmer from the council sewage department go to investigate. They find the drain blocked and slime trails but when they examine the sewer they find nothing wrong. They do not see two slugs hidden in the darkness.

Carol Wilton leaves her four-year-old son Paul in the garden to buy some bread and milk, while he sits and watches slugs eat his rabbit.

Harold Morris, keen gardener, puts on a garden glove that has slugs in some of the fingers. They eat most of his hand by the time Harold, assisted by his wife Jean manage to cut it off with shears and a trowel.

Mike Brady and his wife Kim are doing some gardening when Brady is attacked by slugs who try to bite his hand. He manages to put three of the slugs into a jar. Mike and Kim take the captured slugs to Merton Museum for advice. Museum curator John Foley examines the slugs but tells them he is no expert. Brady asks Foley if he thinks slugs could kill a man. He puts a pond snail in a tray with a slug and the slug immediately eats the snail.
Brady goes to a garden centre and buys a bottle of slug poison and some slug pellets. He puts them down in his garden.

Kath Green leaves her two-year-old daughter Amanda playing with her dolls in her conservatory to buy the little girl an ice cream. In her mother's absence, Amanda finds a slime trail, puts her hand in it and licks it off. Later that night, Kath rushes into Amanda's bedroom to find her convulsing on the bed. In a wild frenzy, Amanda bites her Mum's neck who then falls downstairs bleeding to death. Ray Green returns home from work to find both his wife and daughter dead.

Brady goes to see if the poison has done its job, but although some of the pellets have gone, the slugs are still there.
Computer firm rep David Watson and his wife Maureen sit down to Sunday lunch. David eats half a slug which was hidden in some lettuce. He goes to bed that night with a terrible stomach ache and awakes with a very bad headache.

At a business lunch that day in the City Hotel, David Watson tries to secure a new contract with Edward Canning and Kenneth Riggs. David is overcome by a terrible headache until finally blood gushes from one of his nostrils and a long white worm slithers out of it. David falls onto a table dying as another slug bursts out of one of his eyes. A waiter from the restaurant calls the Local Health Inspector.

Brady investigates the sickening scene and finds the worms lying dead next to Watson's body. He takes them to the museum for Foley to look at. Foley tells Brady that he has been reading up on the slugs and after dissecting and doing tests, he says that they are a hybrid of the ordinary garden variety. The white worms are "schistosomes," a parasite found in the blood stream of slugs. If ingested by humans they cause the often fatal disease Schistomiasis. Foley tells Brady that he will start work on making a poison.

Bobby Talbot, 18, and Donna Moss, 17, are having sex in Donna's parents' bedroom while they are out. Slugs make their way through the garden, into the drain, up the drain pipe, along the guttering, down onto a window sill and drop onto the floor of the bedroom. Donna is killed first as the slugs crawl inside her. Bobby, also being eaten alive jumps from the bedroom window straight onto a cold frame below and is killed by a shard of glass.

Brady returns home and tells Kim about the days events at the City Hotel. He explains what Foley told him, adding that he thinks slugs killed Ron Bell. Kim goes into the kitchen to find six slugs which have crawled out of a tap. Brady kills them all but realises the slugs are in the water supply and will be all over Merton.

Gravedigger Charlie Barnes digs up a grave during the night to rob the occupants valuables, but is eaten alive by slugs when he falls in.
Brady calls his G.P. Dr. Warwick at his surgery to see if he has had any unusual cases. The doctor tells him he has had nine complaints so far of nausea, headaches, sensitivity to light, diarrhoea, fever and vomiting. Brady explains that he thinks the water is contaminated, and Warwick says that there is a species of snail that spreads a disease called Bilharzia, but that disease is confined to Africa and Asia. Brady goes to see Merton's Water Board Inspector Frank Phillips and explains to him what has happened, asking him to turn the water supply off. Phillips laughs and refuses. Brady spots an article in a local newspaper saying that police are baffled about three mysterious deaths. He returns to his office to find that Foley has left a message with Julie.

Brady goes to see Foley at the museum. He has developed a liquid that kills slugs on contact. However, it explodes when it touches moisture so they talk to Don Palmer about how to get it into the sewer system. The plan is for Brady and Palmer to go down into the sewer by Ron Bell's house and act as bait, luring the slugs into a central chamber, while Foley waits above ground and releases the poison. Brady and Palmer climb into Ron Bell's house through a broken window and go down into the cellar where they find hundreds of slugs on the floor. They empty a can of petrol into the cellar, ignite it then leave the house. Equipped with overalls, masks, oxygen tanks and two-way radios, Brady and Palmer and go down into the sewer via a manhole cover outside the house.

Brady and Palmer test their radios, then begin searching the central chambers of the sewers for the slugs' nest. Foley follows them in above his car. They find the slugs, but become trapped when they cannot remove a grille from a chamber. Brady eventually removes the grille but Palmer is eaten by the slugs in the meantime. Foley drives to the manhole cover where Brady can escape but the cover is jammed shut. Using a rope tied to his car he manages to remove the manhole cover, just before Brady's oxygen supply runs out. Both men tip the 5 gallon drum of poison down into the sewer which sets off a chain reaction sweeping through the entire Merton sewer system.

Farmer George Thomas from Merton, drives to London's Covent Garden to deliver some vegetables to a buyer. The buyer searches through the vegetables, throwing the rotten ones into a pile. In amongst some rotten lettuces are some slugs' eggs...

Sequel
A sequel titled Breeding Ground was published in 1985 and a film for the sequel was considered but was never made.

References

External links
 Official Shaun Hutson website

1982 British novels
British horror novels
British novels adapted into films
W. H. Allen & Co. books